The Dutch National Track Championships – Women's scratch is the Dutch national championship scratch race event held annually at the Dutch National Track Championships. The event was first introduced in 2003.

Medalists

Results from cyclebase.nl and cyclingarchives.com.

Multiple champions
4 times champion: Adrie Visser
3 times champion: Kirsten Wild

References

 
Dutch National track cycling championships
Women's scratch